The white-chested tinkerbird (Pogoniulus makawai) is a species of bird in the Lybiidae family (African barbets).
It is endemic to the Zambezian Cryptosepalum dry forests of Zambia.  It is only known from the single type specimen, collected in 1964 by Jali Makawa, the field assistant and collector for Constantine Benson. Genetic evidence suggests that it may not be a separate species, but instead be a population embedded within the yellow-rumped tinkerbird if it is not an aberrant individual.

References

External links
 White-chested Tinkerbird (Pogoniulus makawai) BirdLife species factsheet

white-chested tinkerbird
Endemic birds of Zambia
white-chested tinkerbird
Taxonomy articles created by Polbot